Rene Tschernitschek (born 30 March 1977) is a German gymnast. He competed in at the 2000 Summer Olympics.

References

External links
 

1977 births
Living people
German male artistic gymnasts
Olympic gymnasts of Germany
Gymnasts at the 2000 Summer Olympics
Sportspeople from Halle (Saale)